Amerila androfusca is a moth of the  subfamily Arctiinae. It was described by Elliot Pinhey in 1952. It is found in Kenya and Tanzania.

References

Moths described in 1952
Amerilini
Moths of Africa